Topal Izzet Mehmed Pasha, Topal Izzet Pasha, or Darendeli Mehmed Pasha (1792–1855) was an Ottoman admiral and reformist statesman during the Tanzimat period. He was Grand Vizier of the Ottoman Empire during two terms:
 24 October 1828 - 28 January 1829
 7 October 1841 - 30 August 1842

Around 1840, he also served as the Kapudan Pasha (Grand Admiral) of the Ottoman Navy.

See also
 Topal

References

19th-century Grand Viziers of the Ottoman Empire
Ottoman people of the Greek War of Independence
Kapudan Pashas
1792 births
1838 deaths